The Philadelphia Foundation is a community foundation that serves the Greater Philadelphia community. The five primary counties served are Philadelphia, Bucks, Chester, Delaware, and Montgomery. It is one of the oldest and largest community foundations in the United States, awarding more than $20 million in annual grants from more than 800 charitable funds.

History 
The foundation was established as a "community trust" by the Fidelity Trust Company in December 1918. Initially the committee to distribute funds was composed of five individuals: one appointed by the Pennsylvania Governor, one appointed by the senior judge of the United States District Court, one appointed by the judge of the Orphans' Court, and two appointed by the Board of Directors of the Fidelity Trust Company.

Mission
The mission of The Philadelphia Foundation is "building philanthropic resources, managing those resources well, and distributing those resources effectively." This is part of their larger vision of "a flourishing Delaware Valley made up of safe, thriving and diverse communities, strengthened by a dynamic and robust nonprofit sector that is critical to our quality of life, and that inspires civic participation through philanthropy." It manages approximately 900 funds and makes over 1,000 grants and scholarship awards each year.

See also
 Philadelphia Media Network
 William Penn Foundation
 Connelly Foundation
 Community foundation

References

External links
 Official website

Non-profit organizations based in Philadelphia
Community foundations based in the United States